The Telus Skins Game was a Canadian annual summer golf event, sponsored by Telus, and officially known as the Telus World Skins Game. It was hosted at a different golf course each year within Canada.

Between 2006 and 2012, the Telus Skins Game incorporated a "world" theme, which incorporated five golfers from different countries.

In May 2013, it was announced that the Skins Game would not be played after Telus decided not to renew its deal as title sponsor.

History 
2012 Glen Arbour Golf Course, Halifax, Nova Scotia

2011 Banff Springs Golf Course, Banff, Alberta

2010 Bear Mountain Resort, Victoria, British Columbia

2009 La Tempête Golf Club, Lévis, Quebec

2008 Predator Ridge Resort, Vernon, BC

2007 The Raven Golf Club at Lora Bay, Town of the Blue Mountains, ON

2006 The Fairmont Banff Springs Golf Course, Banff, AB

2005 Nicklaus North Golf Club, Whistler, BC

* No player won the skin on the 18th hole. The players decided to give the money to charity.

2004 Club de Golf Le Fontainebleau, Blainville, Quebec

2003 Royal Niagara Golf Club, Niagara-on-the-Lake, Ontario

2002 The Mark O'Meara Course at Delta Grandview Resort, Huntsville, Ontario

2001 Angus Glen Golf Club, Markham, Ontario

2000 Predator Ridge Resort, Okanagan Valley, B.C.

1999 Le Diable, Mont Tremblant, Quebec

1998 The Links at Crowbush Cove, Morell, P.E.I.

1997 Nicklaus North Golf Club, Whistler, B.C.

1996 Summerlea Golf Club, Vaudreuil-Dorion, Quebec

1995 The National Golf Club of Canada, Woodbridge, Ontario

1994 Richelieu Valley Golf Club, Sainte-Julie de Vercheres, Quebec

1993 Devil's Pulpit Golf Club, Caledon, Ontario

References

External links 

Unofficial money golf tournaments
Golf tournaments in Canada
Recurring sporting events established in 1993
1993 establishments in Canada